Shannon Patricia O'Neill is an American comedian, actress, writer, and director who worked as the artistic director of the Upright Citizens Brigade. O'Neill was a regular guest on The Chris Gethard Show and has had numerous roles in film and television. In 2020, O'Neill appeared as Sonja Farak in How to Fix a Drug Scandal, a true crime documentary miniseries. In the series, O'Neill recreates Farak's court testimony using official transcripts from her grand jury trial.

Filmography

Film

Television

References 

Living people
American comedians
Upright Citizens Brigade Theater performers
Year of birth missing (living people)